The so-called Mourning Athena is an Athenian marble relief dated circa 460 BC. 
The relief is 0.48 m high and made of Parian marble.  It is displayed at the Acropolis Museum in Athens, inventory no. 695.

Description 

The goddess, marked by her helmet of the Corinthian type, wears a peplos, clasped at the shoulders and cinched at the waist.  She rests her right hand on her hip and crosses her left leg over her right.  Her left hand grasps a spear on which she leans, and her head is inclined.  

The meaning of her bowed head has been a matter of debate since the relief's excavation from the Acropolis of Athens in 1888.  As the conventional name suggests, many have taken the posture to indicate sadness or pensiveness, and thus to interpret the rectangular object on the viewer's right as a stele, a stone slab that serves as a grave marker.  Others see an 'exhausted Athena', and others still see no such emotion.  The exact nature of the rectangular object, too, is unclear – some suggest that an object was perched atop it (e.g., the infant Erichthonius) – others that it is a marker from a race-course.

External links
Acropolis Museum's database entry.

5th-century BC Greek sculptures
Sculptures of Athena
Marble sculptures in Greece
Acropolis Museum
Marble reliefs
Sculptures in Athens
1888 archaeological discoveries